"I Have You" is a song written by Paul and Gene Nelson, and recorded by American country music artist Glen Campbell. It was released in May 1988 as the fourth single from the album Still Within the Sound of My Voice.  The song reached number 7 on the Billboard Hot Country Singles & Tracks chart.

Charts

Weekly charts

Year-end charts

Adaptation 
"I Have You" was covered in a Cantonese version as "有著你" and recorded in the album 《長青歌集》 by George Lam. (1989)

References 

1988 singles
1987 songs
Glen Campbell songs
Song recordings produced by Jimmy Bowen
MCA Records singles
Songs written by Paul Nelson (songwriter)
Songs written by Gene Nelson (songwriter)